The UC Davis Graduate School of Management (GSM) is a graduate business school at the University of California, Davis. Established in 1981, its degree programs include MBA, MPAc and MSBA.

The GSM offers Master of Business Administration (MBA) degrees in three locations: The two-year, Full-Time MBA program is offered at the main campus in Davis. Two working professional programs are offered in Sacramento and San Ramon in the San Francisco Bay Area. The school also offers an Online MBA program with the same standards and credit hours as the in-person programs.

The UC Davis Full-Time MBA is ranked 37th in the nation by U.S. News & World Report. The in-person working professional programs are designed to be completed in three years, but may be "accelerated" to finish in two by taking additional classes.

The Graduate School of Management began a 9-month MPAc (Master of Professional Accountancy) program in 2012.

In 2017, the school launched a 10-month MSBA (Master of Science in Business Analytics) program in San Francisco.

UC Davis undergraduates can minor in technology management or accounting. GSM's executive programs include the Wine Executive program, jointly managed with the Department of Viticulture & Enology.

The school's teaching model combines case study, experiential learning, lecture and team projects.

The school's LEED Platinum certified facility, Maurice J. Gallagher, Jr. Hall, opened in September 2009.

Master of Business Administration
The MBA degree requires completing 72 hours of credit (24 courses) with a cumulative grade point average of 3.0 or better. MBA students at UC Davis may also seek to earn a joint degree such as a J.D./M.B.A., MBA/Doctor of Medicine (MD), MBA/Master of Science in Engineering (MSE), and MBA/Master of Science (MS) in Agricultural and Resource Economics.

MBA concentrations offered include: Accounting; Competitive Analytics and Technologies; Finance; Information Technology; General Management; Marketing; Technology Management; and Entrepreneurship. MBA specializations are offered in Agribusiness; Biotechnology; Corporate and Social Responsibility; Healthcare; High Tech; International Business; Non-Profit; Real Estate; Small Business; and Wine Industry.

The MBA curriculum is anchored by IMPACT, a new, two-part capstone course designed to sharpen writing, speaking and critical-thinking abilities. IMPACT teams work on 10-week projects for clients ranging from multinational Fortune 500 firms to ultra-fast-paced Silicon Valley start-ups.

Team projects are organized around industry sectors directly connected to UC Davis' research strengths: Clean technology and Energy, Biotechnology, Information Technology, Healthcare Delivery, Telemedicine, Foods, Nutrition and Agribusiness Service sectors (e.g., finance and consulting) and OneHealth (the intersection of human and animal medicine). Recently, the program has also introduced an enhanced, two-year leadership and career development training program.

Master of Professional Accountancy
In 2012 UC Davis became the first University of California school to offer a master's degree in professional accountancy—a response to major changes in educational requirements and the resulting need for improved training of certified public accountants in California.

The MPAc program requires students to pass an examination after advancing to candidacy, and at the end of all coursework, in order to receive the degree.

Master of Science in Business Analytics 
With its inaugurating class in Fall of 2017, the school launched a master's degree in Business Analytics, at its UC Hastings extension campus in San Francisco.

Research centers
Institute for Innovation and Entrepreneurship - Under the direction of Professor Andrew Hargadon.
Center for Investor Welfare and Corporate Responsibility - Under the direction of Professor Brad M. Barber, engaged in research related to investor welfare, corporate fraud, white-collar crime, corporate ethics and social responsibility. The Center advocates for improved corporate practices, educates investors through research and outreach.

Student life
Associated Students of Management (ASM) provides the framework for incorporating student ideas into the MBA program, networking with alumni, engaging in philanthropic activities, and coordinating extracurricular and social events.
Big Bang! is the annual UC Davis Business Plan Competition organized by MBA students. The competition promotes new business development, technology transfer and entrepreneurship on campus and in Northern California.  Over 20 thousand dollars are awarded to the winners of the competition each year.
MBA Challenge for Charity (C4C) supports the Special Olympics and family-related local charities.
Net Impact offers programs to help its members broaden their business education, refine leadership skills, pursue professional goals and build their network.
Various intramural sports teams that compete against other teams on campus in recreational sports such as flag football, soccer, basketball, and inner tube water polo.

Rankings
U.S. News & World Report
 2017: Full-Time MBA program ranked #37 nationally; Part-Time MBA program ranked #32 nationally 
 2016: Full-Time MBA program ranked #48 nationally; Part-Time MBA program ranked #29 nationally 
 2015: Full-Time MBA program ranked #41 nationally, Part-Time MBA program ranked #25 nationally 

Financial Times
 2014: Full-Time MBA Program ranked #98 globally 
 2013: Full-Time MBA Program ranked #95 globally 

The Economist
 2017: Full-Time MBA program ranked #51 nationally and #83 globally
 2016: Full-Time MBA program ranked #47 nationally and #71 globally 
 2014: Full-Time MBA program ranked #40 nationally and #68 globally 
 2013: Full-Time MBA program ranked #38 nationally and #65 globally 

BusinessWeek
 2014: Full-Time MBA program ranked #60 nationally 

Forbes Magazine
 2017: Full-Time MBA program ranked #63 nationally
 2016: Full-Time MBA program ranked #61 nationally 
 2011: Full-Time MBA program ranked #72 nationally

See also
List of United States business school rankings
List of business schools in the United States
Informs: Analytics and OR/MS Education

References

External links
 Official website

Business schools in California
Graduate School of Management
Educational institutions established in 1981
1981 establishments in California